The General Union of Palestinian Teachers (GUPT) is the main teacher association in Palestine.

Founded in 1990, GUPT supports Palestinian teachers and aims to  build good relations with the teacher unions around the world. It follows the General Union of Teachers in Palestine (f.1969)

In 1994, after the establishment of the Palestinian National Authority,  the name of the union was changed to "The General Union of Palestinian Teachers - GUPT".

External links
Official website

Education-related professional associations